Deutsche Schule Santiago (DS) is a German international school in Santiago. Years 7 through 12 and the school administration are at the Las Condes campus. Years one through six are at the Vitacura Campus. Preschool classes are held at the Cerro Colorado campus in Las Condes.

The first classes were held on March 3, 1891.

See also
 German Chileans

References

External links
 

International schools in Santiago, Chile
Santiago
Private schools in Chile
Educational institutions established in 1891
1891 establishments in Chile